Ron Laboray (born 1970) is a visual artist best known for conceptual art and painting.

Studio history 

The work of Ron Laboray has been displayed in museums, special project spaces, not for profits and galleries in cities such as Los Angeles, Chicago, Taiwan, Japan, Memphis, Tennessee Sadalia, and St. Louis, Missouri.

His exhibition "After The C.E." at the University of Missouri was reviewed in Art in America magazine.

The website of Peter Miller Gallery in Chicago describes Laboray's art as merging abstract painting and a pseudoscientific method to create a visual archive of popular culture. This method appropriates existing laws found in sciences, like the Law of Superposition, and the artist's sculptural mixed media mechanisms. The mediums used range from the digital to plastic, aluminum, auto lacquer, decals and marker which are all metaphoric of popular culture. Abstract painting's beautiful object collides with a color-coded archive based on mass culture elements like television, cinema. comic books and advertising.

Major group exhibition have included Terra Incognita at The Contemporary Art Museum, St Louis included in the exhibition were Julie Mahretu, Lordy Rodriguez, and Mark Lombardi.

Transpolyblu a Digital Exhibition including Wil Mentor, Sabina Ott, and Chuck Close.

Bibliography 
Reviews and description of Ron Laboray's work and exhibitions can be seen in the following publications:
 St Louis Magazine – Cameo: A Peek into the Studio of Ron Laboray- November 2010 – by Hesse Caplinger
 Art in America - April 2006 - review “ Ron Laboray at UMSL St Louis” Mel Watkins
 Chicago Tribune - May 13, 2005- “Ron Laboray Lets Data Drive His Abstractions” Alan G. Artner
 River Front Times - Current Art- Review -Ron Laboray: After the C.E. Sept 2005
 St. Louis Post Dispatch - July 14, 2002 Arts and Entertainment-Putting Art on the Map by Jeff Daniels
 Chicago Sun-Times - February 2, 2001 Gallery Glance by Margaret Hawkins
 New Art Examiner -May/June, 2001 Vol.28 # 8/9 Chicago's West Loop Gate by Lori Waxman
 Art Papers magazine - May/June, 2001 Vol.25.3 Reviews Central - St. Louis by Jeffrey Huges

References

External links
www.ronlaboray.com

1970 births
Living people
20th-century American painters
American male painters
21st-century American painters
American conceptual artists
Artists from Illinois
American contemporary painters
20th-century American male artists